Wright Brothers National Memorial, located in Kill Devil Hills, North Carolina, commemorates the first successful, sustained, powered flights in a heavier-than-air machine.  From 1900 to 1903, Wilbur and Orville Wright came here from Dayton, Ohio, based on information from the U.S. Weather Bureau about the area's steady winds. They also valued the privacy provided by this location, which in the early twentieth century was remote from major population centers.

Administrative history
Authorized as Kill Devil Hill Monument on March 2, 1927, it was transferred from the War Department to the National Park Service  on August 10, 1933.  Congress renamed it and designated it a national memorial on December 4, 1953.  As with all historic areas administered by the National Park Service, the national memorial was listed on the National Register of Historic Places on October 15, 1966.  The memorial's visitor center, designed by Ehrman Mitchell and Romaldo Giurgola, was designated a National Historic Landmark on January 3, 2001.  The memorial is co-managed with two other Outer Banks parks, Fort Raleigh National Historic Site and Cape Hatteras National Seashore.

Exhibits and features

The field and hangar
The Wrights made four flights from level ground near the base of the hill on December 17, 1903, in the Wright Flyer, following three years of gliding experiments from atop this and other nearby sand dunes. It is possible to walk along the actual routes of the four flights, with small monuments marking their starts and finishes. Two wooden sheds, based on historic photographs, recreate the world's first airplane hangar and the brothers' living quarters.

Visitor Center
The Visitor Center is home to a museum featuring models and actual tools and machines used by the Wright brothers during their flight experiments including a reproduction of the wind tunnel used to test wing shapes and a portion of the engine used in the first flight. In one wing of the Visitor Center is a life-size replica of the Wright brothers' 1903 Wright Flyer, the first powered heavier-than-air aircraft in history to achieve controlled flight (the original being displayed at the National Air and Space Museum in Washington D.C.).  A full-scale model of the Brothers' 1902 glider is also present, having been constructed under the direction of Orville Wright himself. Adorning the walls of the glider room are portraits and photographs of other flight pioneers throughout history.

The visitor center's Modern design was a departure from the National Park Service's earlier, more traditional buildings, and was built as part of its "Mission 66" modernization and expansion program.  As the first major building of that effort, it was a high-profile success, bringing critical notice for its Modern design and launching the careers of its designers.  It was designated a National Historic Landmark in 1975 for its architecture and its importance to the Park Service's program.

Kill Devil Hill and the Memorial Tower
A  granite monument, dedicated in 1932, is perched atop  Kill Devil Hill, commemorating the achievement of the Wright brothers. They conducted many of their glider tests on the massive shifting dune that was later stabilized to form Kill Devil Hill. Inscribed in capital letters along the base of the memorial tower is the phrase "In commemoration of the conquest of the air by the brothers Wilbur and Orville Wright conceived by genius achieved by dauntless resolution and unconquerable faith." Atop the tower is a marine beacon, similar to one found in a lighthouse.

The doors of the tower are stainless steel over nickel, with a price of $3,000 in 1928. The six relief panels represent the conquest of the air:

Left Door (top to bottom): The contraptions of the French locksmith Besnier, who thought he could fly if he propelled himself into the air while wearing paddles on his arms and legs; An homage to Otto Lilienthal, a German who died while conducting gliding experiments; A reference to a French philosopher who thought that since dew rose in the morning, if it could be placed in an expandable bag attached to a box and sail, it would naturally rise when placed in the sun. (It didn't.)

Right Door (top to bottom): Icarus, the Greek mythological figure who tried to fly from Crete by attaching feathers to his arms with wax. He fell when he flew too close to the sun, melting the wax; Bird flight to plane flight, or the rise of a phoenix; Kites used by the Wrights and others in early experiments

Building the Memorial
The tower was designed by Rodgers and Poor, a New York City architectural firm; the design was officially selected on February 14, 1930. Prior to the memorial's construction, the War Department selected Captain William H. Kindervater of the Quartermaster Corps to prepare the site for construction and to manage the area landscaping. To secure the sandy foundation, Captain Kindervater selected bermuda grass to be planted on Kill Devil Hill and the surrounding area. He also ordered a special fertilizer to be spread throughout the area to promote grass and shrubbery growth and decided to build a fence to prevent animal grazing. With a strong foundation in place, the Office of the Quartermaster selected Marine Captain John A. Gilman to preside over the construction project. Construction began in October 1931 and with a budget of $213,000 (equivalent to $ in ), the memorial was completed in November 1932. In the end, 1,200 tons of granite, more than 2,000 tons of gravel, more than 800 tons of sand and almost 400 tons of cement were used to build the structure, along with numerous other materials.  It is constructed of granite mined at the North Carolina Granite Corporation Quarry Complex.

Memorial dedication
November 14, 1932, was selected as the dedication day.  Over 20,000 people were expected to attend the event, but only around 1,000 showed up on a stormy and windy day. Orville Wright was the main guest of honor at the ceremony, and aviator Ruth Nichols was given the privilege of removing the American flag that covered the word "GENIUS" and the plaque on the monument. President Herbert Hoover was unable to attend the ceremony, but a letter from the President was read prior to the dedication. The ceremony also marked the rare occasion when one of the persons the memorial was dedicated to (Orville Wright) was still living.

The hill offers great views of the surrounding area.

Repairs
In 2008, the memorial, long plagued by seepage problems, was refurbished and better water control measures were installed.  Interior lighting was improved and a steel map of early aviation flights restored.  Visitors occasionally may ascend the tower by reservation.

Centennial of Flight

On December 17, 2003, the Centennial of Flight was celebrated at the Park.  The ceremony was hosted by flight enthusiast John Travolta, and included appearances by President George W. Bush, Apollo 11 astronauts Neil Armstrong and Buzz Aldrin, and test pilot Chuck Yeager. The Centennial Pavilion was built for the celebration and housed exhibits showing the Outer Banks at the turn-of-the-century, the development of the 1903 replica, and NASA provided displays on aviation and flight.  The Centennial Pavilion closed in 2014 and is slated to be demolished due to budget constraints.

An interactive sculpture was donated by the State of North Carolina and dedicated during the celebration.  The life sized sculpture, created by Stephen H. Smith, is a full-sized replica of the 1903 Wright Flyer the moment the flight began and includes the Wright Brothers along with members of the Kill Devil Hills Life-Saving Station who assisted in moving the aircraft, as well as John T. Daniels who took the now famous photograph of the first flight.

The sculpture correctly has a criss-crossed chain driving the port propeller but incorrectly has this propeller being identical to, rather than a mirror image of, the starboard propeller.

Gallery

See also 
 Dayton Aviation Heritage National Historical Park
 List of National Historic Landmarks in North Carolina
 List of national memorials of the United States
 National Register of Historic Places listings in Dare County, North Carolina

References

External links

 
 
 
 
 
 
 

1932 sculptures
Aerospace museums in North Carolina
Art Deco sculptures and memorials
Artworks in the collection of the National Park Service
Air transportation on the National Register of Historic Places
Aviation history of the United States
Biographical museums in North Carolina
Buildings and structures in Dare County, North Carolina
Monuments and memorials on the National Register of Historic Places in North Carolina
Historic American Buildings Survey in North Carolina
Mission 66
Monuments and memorials in North Carolina
Museums in Dare County, North Carolina
National Historic Landmarks in North Carolina
National Memorials of the United States
National Register of Historic Places in Dare County, North Carolina
Outer Banks
Protected areas established in 1927
Protected areas of Dare County, North Carolina
National Park Service areas in North Carolina
Wright brothers
1927 establishments in North Carolina
Granite sculptures in North Carolina